"Another Lover" is the second solo single by English singer Dane Bowers from his debut album, Facing the Crowd (2001). Like his previous single, the song also peaked at No. 9 on the UK Singles Chart in July 2001. It was to be his last single with Arista before being dropped by the label. Bowers would release one more single nine years later titled "All She Needs" on the Conehead UK label which failed to chart.

Track listing
UK & Ireland CD single
 "Another Lover" (Jerry Duplessis Mix) - 4:13
 "Will I Ever Need to Love Again" (Live at The Kashmir) - 3:46
 "Another Lover" (Live at The Kashmir)	- 4:45
 Another Lover	Video - 3:51

UK 12" vinyl
A1. "Another Lover" (X-Men Vocal) - 5:02
A2. "Another Lover" (X-Men Dark Dub) - 4:48
B1. "Another Lover" (Blacksmith R&B Rub) - 4:54
B2. "Another Lover" (Fyrus Full Mix) - 5:14

References

2001 songs
2001 singles
Dane Bowers songs
Arista Records singles